The 2013 World Taekwondo Grand Prix was the 1st edition of the World Taekwondo Grand Prix and was held in Manchester, United Kingdom from 13 to 15 December 2013.

Medal summary

Men

Women

Medal table

References

External links
 Official website

World Taekwondo Grand Prix
Grand Prix